The Men's Greco-Roman 72 kg is a competition featured at the 2018 European Wrestling Championships, and was held in Kaspiysk, Russia on May 1 and May 2.

Medalists

Iuri Lomadze won a bronze medal but he was stripped of his medal after a doping violation. As a result Daniel Cataraga was awarded the bronze medal.

Results
Legend
F — Won by fall

Final

Top half

Bottom half

Repechage

References

Men's greco-roman 72 kg